The 2018 Food City 500 was a Monster Energy NASCAR Cup Series race held on April 15 and 16, 2018, at Bristol Motor Speedway in Bristol, Tennessee. The second half of the race was postponed to April 16 due to rain. Contested over 500 laps on the  concrete short track, it was the eighth race of the 2018 Monster Energy NASCAR Cup Series season.

Report

Background

Bristol Motor Speedway, formerly known as Bristol International Raceway and Bristol Raceway, is a NASCAR short track venue located in Bristol, Tennessee. Constructed in 1960, it held its first NASCAR race on July 30, 1961. Despite its short length, Bristol is among the most popular tracks on the NASCAR schedule because of its distinct features, which include extraordinarily steep banking, an all concrete surface, two pit roads, and stadium-like seating.

Entry list

First practice

Qualifying

Qualifying results

Practice (post-qualifying)

Second practice

Final practice

Race

First stage
Kyle Busch led the field to the green flag at 1:13 p.m. The first caution flew on lap 5 for a multi-car wreck involving Chase Elliott, William Byron, Martin Truex Jr., Daniel Suárez, A. J. Allmendinger, Ross Chastain, Michael McDowell, David Ragan, and Chad Finchum.

The race restarted on lap 10, It went back under caution again for the second time on lap 17 for a two-car wreck in turn 2, involving A. J. Allmendinger and Jamie McMurray, The race restarted on lap 23 and the third caution flew for rain, and later intensified and the race was red flagged, After 25 minutes and 25 seconds, the race went back under caution.

Racing resumed on lap 60 and the fourth caution flew two laps later for a two-car wreck on lap 62 involving Ricky Stenhouse Jr. and Erik Jones, Harrison Rhodes won the free pass under caution.

The race restarted on lap 68. Caution flew the fifth time for another multi-car wreck on lap 119 involving Ryan Blaney, Jamie McMurray, Chris Buescher, David Ragan, Harrison Rhodes, and Trevor Bayne, This brought out the red flag for the second time of the race to facilitate cleanup in turn 3, After 6 minutes and 29 minutes, The red flag was lifted and the race went back under caution.

The race restarted on lap 125. It remained green the remainder of the stage, that was won by Brad Keselowski, and went back under caution for the sixth time on lap 127 for the end of the stage.

Second stage
The race restarted on lap 135, Kyle Larson passed Keselowski to take the lead, The seventh caution flew on lap 156 when Trevor Bayne spun out in turn 4, Rain returned moments later and the red flag was displayed for the third time, After 26 minutes and 54 seconds, the race went back under caution, and the race restarted on lap 170.

Caution flew again for the eighth time for rain on lap 204, Persistent precipitation in the eastern Tennessee mountains delayed the restart of the race, and the cars went back to pit road as the red flag was displayed for the fourth time, Eventually, The remainder of the race was postponed until Monday.

When the race resumed on Monday, A mixture of rain and sleet fell on the track around lunchtime Monday, and track dryers were busy much of the day. Cars finally returned to the track at 1:32 p.m. ET, about a half-hour later than scheduled.

The race restarted on lap 218, Brad Keselowski won the second stage and the ninth caution flew for the conclusion of the stage. Following in the top 10 were Johnson, Denny Hamlin, Larson, Stenhouse, Bowman, Kevin Harvick, Austin Dillon and Wallace.

Final stage

The race restarted on lap 262, and it remained green for 63 laps.

Contact from Ryan Newman sent Kyle Larson sliding through the center of the track on lap 324, bringing out the tenth caution, Larson, who had one of the race's strongest cars, avoided contact with the wall and stayed on the lead lap.

The race restarted on lap 330, and the eleventh caution came out on lap 354 when Reed Sorenson spun out in turn 2. David Ragan won the free pass under caution.

The race restarted on lap 366, No one should have been surprised after two days of nasty weather, but rain returned on lap 391, bringing out the twelfth caution, Kyle Busch held a 1.1-second lead over Larson.

The race restarted on lap 400.

Brad Keselowski, one of the race's leaders, slapped the wall on lap 471 after a tire issue, bringing out the thirteenth caution and wiping out leader Larson's five-second advantage over second-place Stenhouse. Keselowski's Ford suffered minor damage.

The race restarted on lap 479, Kyle Busch remained sizzling hot, taking the lead on Kyle Larson on lap 494 and winning for the second consecutive week after prevailing at Texas the previous weekend.

"The long delays get you in and out of your game, but you just gotta focus," Busch said in victory lane. "I can't say enough about this Skittles Toyota Camry. We knew it was going to be good in the long runs. We weren't quite as good as the 42 (Larson) on that long run before that last caution came out. I actually thought I had a tire going down, but we were able to get some tires on it and gave it everything we had.

Stage Results

Stage 1
Laps: 125

Stage 2
Laps: 125

Final Stage Results

Stage 3
Laps: 250

Race statistics
 Lead changes: 8 among different drivers
 Cautions/Laps: 13 for 114
 Red flags: 4 for 18 hours 58 minutes and 48 seconds
 Time of race: 3 hours, 26 minutes and 25 seconds
 Average speed:

Media

Television
Fox Sports covered their 18th race at the Bristol Motor Speedway. Mike Joy, five-time Bristol winner Jeff Gordon and 12-time Bristol winner – and all-time Bristol race winner – Darrell Waltrip had the call in the booth for the race. Jamie Little, Vince Welch and Matt Yocum handled the pit road duties for the television side.

Radio
PRN had the radio call for the race which was also be simulcasted on Sirius XM NASCAR Radio. Doug Rice, Mark Garrow and Wendy Venturini called the race in the booth when the field was racing down the frontstretch. Rob Albright called the race from atop the turn 3 suites when the field raced down the backstretch. Brad Gillie, Brett Mcmillan, Jim Noble, and Steve Richards covered the action on pit lane.

Standings after the race

Drivers' Championship standings

Manufacturers' Championship standings

Note: Only the first 16 positions are included for the driver standings.
. – Driver has clinched a position in the Monster Energy NASCAR Cup Series playoffs.

References

Food City 500
Food City 500
Food City 500
NASCAR races at Bristol Motor Speedway